Șura may refer to one of two places in Sibiu County, Romania:

Șura Mare
Șura Mică